Tephen "Tang" Hamilton (born May 26, 1978) is an American former professional basketball player. He played in the National Basketball Association (NBA) for the Miami Heat during the 2001–02 season. Hamilton played college basketball for the Mississippi State Bulldogs.

Life and career

Early life
Born in Jackson, Mississippi, Hamilton was named Mississippi Mr. Basketball during his senior season at Lanier High School.

NBA
Hamilton played in the NBA from October 2001 to November 2001, appeared in nine games for the Miami Heat, and averaged 2.2 points and 2.0 rebounds. His final game was on November 27, 2001 in a 83–84 loss to the Boston Celtics where he played for two minutes and recorded no stats outside of a missed three-pointer.

Career statistics

NBA

Source

Regular season

|-
| style="text-align:left;"|
| style="text-align:left;"|Miami
| 9 || 2 || 10.9 || .526 || .000 || .000 || 2.0 || .6 || .4 || .0 || 2.2

References

External links
NBA stats at Basketball-Reference.com

1978 births
Living people
American expatriate basketball people in Argentina
American expatriate basketball people in Israel
American expatriate basketball people in Mexico
American expatriate basketball people in South Korea
American expatriate basketball people in Ukraine
American expatriate basketball people in Uruguay
American expatriate basketball people in Venezuela
Basketball players from Jackson, Mississippi
BC Azovmash players
Cocodrilos de Caracas players
Columbus Riverdragons players
Dorados de Chihuahua (LNBP) players
Fayetteville Patriots players
Gaiteros del Zulia players
Daegu KOGAS Pegasus players
Ironi Ashkelon players
Israeli Basketball Premier League players
Miami Heat players
Mississippi State Bulldogs men's basketball players
Panteras de Miranda players
Tulsa 66ers players
Undrafted National Basketball Association players
American men's basketball players
Forwards (basketball)
United States men's national basketball team players